Elton: Jewel Box is an eight-disc compilation album by Elton John featuring rare songs from his catalogue including deep cuts, non-album b-sides, and 60 previously unreleased songs and demos. John selected the songs for the compilation, which contains a total of 148 songs, organised in four parts: Deep Cuts, Rarities, B-sides, and And This Is Me.., ending with the song "(I'm Gonna) Love Me Again"  featuring Taron Egerton from Elton John's 2019 biopic film Rocketman.

Reception
David Browne in a review for Rolling Stone notes that the box set is "the most exhaustive and personal retrospective release Elton has ever put together." Chris Roberts, writing for Classic Rock, feels it is "every bit the treasure trove for fans that it aims to be".

Track listing

Discs 1 & 2: Deep Cuts

Discs 1 and 2 consist of lesser known songs, handpicked by Elton John from previously released albums.

Discs 3, 4 and 5: Rarities 1965-1971

Discs 3-5 contain early demos of previously unreleased material as well as original piano demos of songs from his earlier albums. On September 17th, 2020, two months prior to the album's release date, a 1969 demo recording of "Sing Me No Sad Songs" was released for the very first time. This song, described as "a fascinating early taste of what was to come from Elton and Bernie", was used to promote the album.

Elton John describes the early demos as nostalgic and said that "It was so beautiful to listen to the naiveties of some of the songs". He also talked about these songs in the context of representing his humble beginnings and how they helped shape and define him as an artist as well as show the unique relationship John and Taupin had, not only as songwriters but also as friends.

Discs 6 & 7: B Sides 1976-2005

Discs 6 and 7 contain rare b-sides, many of which have been digitalized for the first time. These discs contain 17 songs that were previously only available on vinyl. These tracks, together with the non-album singles released between 1968 and 1975 included on Rare Masters, make all of Elton John's non-album singles available digitally.

In 1980, Elton John sang two duets with French singer France Gall on her single "Les Aveux" / "Donner Pour Donner". Another French song featured on the album is "J’veux D’la Tendresse", a song which was the basis for "Nobody Wins" from The Fox.

Disc 8: And This Is Me...

The eighth and final disc features songs mentioned in Elton John's autobiography Me which John says played an important part in his life. The song "(I'm Gonna) Love Me Again", a duet with Taron Egerton who portrayed Elton John in his film Rocketman, is also included.

See also
Diamonds
Rocketman
Me
 Rare Masters

References

Elton John compilation albums